Matthew McIntyre-Wilson (born 1973 in Hastings, New Zealand) is a jeweller, weaver of accessories inspired by traditional Māori artefacts. He is a Ngā Mahanga and Titahi descent.

Biography 

In 1992, McIntyre-Wilson gained a certificate in Craft and Design from Whitireia Polytechnic, and a diploma in Visual Arts majoring in Jewellery from Hawke's Bay Polytechnic in 1996.

In 2008, the Museum of New Zealand Te Papa Tongarewa purchased the woven silver and copper tātua ("bum belts") that McIntyre-Wilson made after visiting their taonga Māori collection stores. McIntyre-Wilson also investigates the museum's archives in search of items labelled as "marker unknown", and document those items specifically.

Work 

The work of Matthew McIntyre-Wilson borrows from the techniques and styles of traditional Māori artefacts to create woven geometric patterns with copper, silver, gold, or stripped electrical wires. He combines his interest for raranga whakairo with his formal training in jewelry to make tātuas ("bum belts"), arm bands, hinakis (eel pots) and brooches. His master weaver and mentor is Rangi Kiu (Ngāti Kahungunu ki Wairoa).

Exhibitions 

 2008: Seven Stars at City Gallery Wellington
 2009: New Threads: Contemporary Male Weaving at Objectspace Auckland
 2012: Nga Mahana: The Twins at Fingers (gallery)
 2014-2015: Matthew McIntyre Wilson & Maker Unknown at Pataka Art + Museum, the Māori Art Market, and the Spirit Wrestler Gallery in Vancouver, British Columbia.

References

External links 
 Exhibited work since 2012
 

New Zealand jewellers
New Zealand weavers
1973 births
Living people